In phonetics and phonology, a retroflex stop is a type of consonantal sound, made with the tongue curled back and in contact with area behind the alveolar ridge or with the hard palate (hence retroflex), held tightly enough to block the passage of air (hence a stop consonant). The point of contact is commonly either the tongue tip or tongue blade (the portion just behind the tip).

Sometimes, however, the tongue is curled far enough back that the underside actually contacts the palate. That is known as a subapical retroflex stop and particularly occurs in the Dravidian languages of southern India. A stop consonant that is made with the body of the tongue in contact with the hard palate is called a palatal stop.

Retroflex stops are less common than velar stops or alveolar stops and do not occur in English. Retroflex stops are particularly common in the South Asian languages, such as Hindi and Tamil. Although they are fairly rare in European languages, they occur in Swedish and Norwegian.

More generally, several kinds are distinguished:

 , voiceless retroflex stop
 , voiced retroflex stop
 , retroflex ejective (rare)
 , voiced retroflex implosive (extremely rare or nonexistent)
  or  voiceless retroflex implosive (almost certainly nonexistent)

References 

 
 

Retroflex consonants